Sybra botelensis is a species of beetle in the family Cerambycidae. It was described by Breuning and Ohbayashi in 1966.

References

botelensis
Beetles described in 1966